The Bloc of the Party of Pensioners of Ukraine is a political alliance in Ukraine led by Feliks Petrosyan.

The bloc had been organized for participation in the 2007 parliamentary election. At the 2007 parliamentary elections the bloc failed to enter the parliament winning 0,14% of the votes.

The Bloc consists of:

 Party of Pensioners of Ukraine
 Party of Protection of Pensioners of Ukraine

References

Political party alliances in Ukraine
Pensioners' parties